Dick Jol (born 29 March 1956) is a Dutch former football referee, best known for supervising three matches during the 2000 UEFA European Football Championship held in Belgium and the Netherlands.

Early life
Born in Scheveningen, South Holland, Jol started as a footballer. A forward, played several matches for NEC Nijmegen in the Dutch league, before moving on to Belgium where he played for the teams like Menen, Berchem Sport and KV Kortrijk.

Career
Jol was the referee of the 2000 FIFA Club World Championship final between Corinthians and Vasco da Gama. He was the referee in charge of the friendly International match between the Republic of Ireland and England at Lansdowne Road in 1995, which was abandoned due to violent disorder from England supporters. He officiated his first international A-match in 1993 and his last official match in 2001, when he reached the FIFA age limit of 45. Jol was assigned the 2001 UEFA Champions League Final between Bayern Munich and Valencia, in which he awarded three penalties during the 90 minutes before the outcome was eventually decided via a shootout.

References

External links
 Official website
 Profile
 Former footballers become referees

1956 births
Living people
Dutch footballers
Footballers from The Hague
Association football forwards
NEC Nijmegen players
K. Berchem Sport players
Dutch football referees
UEFA Champions League referees
UEFA Euro 2000 referees